The 25th New York State Legislature, consisting of the New York State Senate and the New York State Assembly, met from January 26 to April 5, 1802, during the first year of George Clinton's second tenure as Governor of New York, in Albany.

Background
Under the provisions of the New York Constitution of 1777, amended by the re-apportionment of March 4, 1796, Senators were elected on general tickets in the senatorial districts for four-year terms. They were divided into four classes, and every year about one fourth of the Senate seats came up for election. Assemblymen were elected countywide on general tickets to a one-year term, the whole assembly being renewed annually.

In 1797, Albany was declared the State capital, and all subsequent Legislatures have been meeting there ever since. In 1799, the Legislature enacted that future Legislatures meet on the last Tuesday of January of each year unless called earlier by the governor.

On November 11, 1801, State Senator Moses Vail was appointed Sheriff of Rensselaer County, leaving a vacancy in the Eastern District.

At this time the politicians were divided into two opposing political parties: the Federalists and the Democratic-Republicans.

Elections
The State election was held from April 28 to 30, 1801. Ex-Governor George Clinton (in office 1777-1795) was elected to a seventh term, and Jeremiah Van Rensselaer was elected Lieutenant Governor of New York, both were Democratic-Republicans

Senators Ezra L'Hommedieu (Southern D.), Jacobus S. Bruyn, James G. Graham (both Middle D.), Ebenezer Clark, Jacobus Van Schoonhoven and Abraham Van Vechten (all three Eastern D.) were re-elected. Peter A. Van Bergen (Middle D.), Christopher Hutton (Eastern D.), John Meyer, Isaac Foote (both Western D.) and Assemblyman Lemuel Chipman (Western D.) were also elected to the Senate. Assemblyman Edward Savage (Eastern D.) was elected to fill the vacancy. L'Hommedieu, Bruyn, Graham, Van Bergen and Savage were Democratic-Republicans, Hutton ran on both tickets, the others were Federalists.

Constitutional Convention
On April 6, 1801, the Legislature had passed an "Act Recommending a Convention" which called for the election of delegates to a convention to amend the State Constitution concerning the right to nominate appointees in the Council of Appointment, and the apportionment of the State Legislature. The delegates were elected from August 25 to 27, mirroring the apportionment of the Assembly. The convention met from October 13 to 27, and had a large Democratic-Republican majority. U.S. Vice President Aaron Burr presided.

The Constitutional Convention gave the governor and all four councillors concurrently the right to nominate appointees. The convention also changed the composition of the State Legislature: the number of state senators was fixed permanently at 32; the number of assemblymen was set at 100, but could increase at a rate of two per year until reaching 150.

Sessions
The Legislature met at the Old City Hall in Albany on January 26, 1802; and adjourned on April 5.

Dem.-Rep. Thomas Storm was elected Speaker unanimously.

On March 31, 1802, the Legislature re-apportioned the Assembly seats, according to the provisions of the Constitutional Convention.

State Senate

Districts
The Southern District (9 seats) consisted of Kings, New York, Queens, Richmond, Suffolk and Westchester counties.
The Middle District (12 seats) consisted of Dutchess, Orange, Ulster, Columbia, Delaware, Rockland and Greene counties.
The Eastern District (12 seats) consisted of Washington, Clinton, Rensselaer, Albany, Saratoga and Essex counties.
The Western District (11 seats) consisted of  Montgomery, Herkimer, Ontario, Otsego, Tioga, Onondaga, Schoharie, Steuben, Chenango, Oneida and Cayuga counties.

Note: There are now 62 counties in the State of New York. The counties which are not mentioned in this list had not yet been established, or sufficiently organized, the area being included in one or more of the abovementioned counties.

Members
The asterisk (*) denotes members of the previous Legislature who continued in office as members of this Legislature. Edward Savage and Lemuel Chipman changed from the Assembly to the Senate.

To reduce the number of senators from 43 to 32, as enacted by the Constitutional Convention, 19 members left the Senate at the end of this session: the eleven members who finished their term this year (marked "term left 1 year"); and eight senators who had their term cut short (marked "legislated out of office"). Eight new senators were elected to arrive at 32.

Employees
Clerk: Abraham B. Bancker
Henry I. Bleecker from April 5, 1802

State Assembly

Districts

Albany County (8 seats)
Cayuga County (1 seat)
Chenango County (2 seats)
Clinton and Essex counties (1 seat)
Columbia County (6 seats)
Delaware County (2 seats)
Dutchess County (10 seats)
Greene County (2 seats)
Herkimer County (3 seats)
Kings County (1 seat)
Montgomery County (6 seats)
The City and County of New York (13 seats)
Oneida County (3 seats)
Onondaga County (1 seat)
Ontario and Steuben counties (2 seats)
Orange County (5 seats)
Otsego County (4 seats)
Queens County (4 seats)
Rensselaer County (6 seats)
Richmond County (1 seat)
Rockland County (1 seat)
Saratoga County (5 seats)
Schoharie County (1 seat)
Suffolk County (4 seats)
Tioga County (1 seat)
Ulster County (4 seats)
Washington County (6 seats)
Westchester County (5 seats)

Note: There are now 62 counties in the State of New York. The counties which are not mentioned in this list had not yet been established, or sufficiently organized, the area being included in one or more of the abovementioned counties.

Assemblymen
The asterisk (*) denotes members of the previous Legislature who continued as members of this Legislature.

Employees
Clerk: James Van Ingen
Sergeant-at-Arms: Ephraim Hunt
Doorkeeper: Benjamin Whipple

Notes

Sources
The New York Civil List compiled by Franklin Benjamin Hough (Weed, Parsons and Co., 1858) [see pg. 108f for Senate districts; pg. 118 for senators [lists incorrectly a total of 44 senators, Tayler was not elected]; pg. 148f for Assembly districts; pg. 175 for assemblymen; pg. 55f for constitutional convention]
The History of Political Parties in the State of New-York, from the Ratification of the Federal Constitution to 1840 by Jabez D. Hammond (4th ed., Vol. 1, H. & E. Phinney, Cooperstown, 1846; pages 156ff)
Election result Assembly, Albany Co. at project "A New Nation Votes", compiled by Phil Lampi, hosted by Tufts University Digital Library
Election result Assembly, Columbia Co. at project "A New Nation Votes"
Election result Assembly, Dutchess Co. at project "A New Nation Votes"
Election result Assembly, Herkimer Co. at project "A New Nation Votes"
Election result Assembly, Montgomery Co. at project "A New Nation Votes"
Election result Assembly, Queens Co. at project "A New Nation Votes"
Election result Assembly, Rensselaer Co. at project "A New Nation Votes"
Election result Assembly, Tioga Co. at project "A New Nation Votes"
Election result Assembly, Ulster Co. at project "A New Nation Votes"
Election result Assembly, Suffolk Co. at project "A New Nation Votes"
Election result Assembly, Westchester Co. at project "A New Nation Votes"
Election result Senate, Southern D. at project "A New Nation Votes"
Election result Senate, Middle D. at project "A New Nation Votes"
Election result Senate, Eastern D. at project "A New Nation Votes" [This statement gives more votes for John Tayler than for Edward Savage, but the official result diverged, since Savage was elected to the Council of Appointment.]
Election result Senate, Western D. at project "A New Nation Votes"

1801 in New York (state)
1802 in New York (state)
025
1801 U.S. legislative sessions